9916 Kibirev, provisional designation , is a Koronian asteroid from the outer regions of the asteroid belt, approximately  in diameter. It was discovered on 3 October 1978, by astronomer Nikolai Chernykh at the Crimean Astrophysical Observatory in Nauchnij, on the Crimean peninsula. The likely S-type asteroid has a rotation period of about 15.2 hours and was named after Russian informatician Sergej Kibirev.

Orbit and classification 

Kibirev is a core member of the Koronis family, a very large outer asteroid family with nearly co-planar ecliptical orbits. It orbits the Sun in the outer main-belt at a distance of 2.6–3.1 AU once every 4 years and 10 months (1,757 days; semi-major axis of 2.85 AU). Its orbit has an eccentricity of 0.09 and an inclination of 1° with respect to the ecliptic. The body's observation arc begins with a precovery taken at Palomar Observatory in September 1973, or 5 years prior to its official discovery observation.

Physical characteristics 

Kibirev is an assumed S-type asteroid, which is also the Koronis family's overall spectral type.

Rotation period 

In 2014, two rotational lightcurves of Kibirev were obtained from photometric observations in the R-band by astronomers at the Palomar Transient Factory in California. Lightcurve analysis gave a rotation period of 15.171 and 15.48 hours with a brightness amplitude of 0.36 and 0.45 magnitude, respectively.

Diameter and albedo 

According to the survey carried out by the NEOWISE mission of NASA's Wide-field Infrared Survey Explorer, Kibirev measures 6.201 kilometers in diameter and its surface has an albedo between 0.260 and 0.2898.

The Collaborative Asteroid Lightcurve Link assumes an albedo of 0.24 and calculates a diameter of 5.49 kilometers based on an absolute magnitude of 13.47.

Naming 

This minor planet was named after Russian Sergej Feodosievich Kibirev (born 1950), who works on new methods to process information and organizes the production of microelectronics in the Russian city of Novosibirsk. The official naming citation was published by the Minor Planet Center on 9 March 2001.

References

External links 
 Asteroid Lightcurve Database (LCDB), query form (info )
 Dictionary of Minor Planet Names, Google books
 Discovery Circumstances: Numbered Minor Planets (5001)-(10000) – Minor Planet Center
 
 

009916
Discoveries by Nikolai Chernykh
Named minor planets
19781003